Alan Fletcher is the name of:

 Alan Fletcher (footballer) (1917–1984), British footballer
 Alan Fletcher (artist) (1930–1958), Scottish painter and sculptor
 Alan Fletcher (graphic designer) (1931–2006), British graphic designer
 Alan Fletcher (composer) (born 1956), American composer
 Alan Fletcher (actor) (born 1957), Australian actor
 Alan Fletcher (politician) (1907–1991), Australian politician